The Torre Cabrera is a watchtower in Pozzallo, Sicily. It was originally built in the 15th century, and was enlarged and rebuilt in the following centuries. Today, it is in good condition and it is open to the public as a museum.

History
In the 15th century, the site of Pozzallo had natural springs known as "Pozzofeto" and "Senia", which were marked on nautical charts and were well known among sailors. When the Chiaramontes, Counts of Modica built a warehouse complex containing docks and ramps for the loading of goods on ships, it became necessary to construct fortifications in order to defend the area. In the early 15th century, King Alfonso V of Aragon authorized Count Giovanni Bernardo Cabrera to construct a tower which bore his name. The coat of arms of the House of Cabrera is sculpted inside the tower.

The tower became an impressive structure and it had great military importance, since it was used to defend Pozzallo from attacks by pirates. The tower was garrisoned by soldiers and gunners, and guns of different calibers were placed on its terraces. Captured pirates or other criminals were executed at the tower by being placed in a room on the rocks and being drowned by the high tide.

The tower was modified and enlarged in the first half of the 16th century, during the reign of Emperor Charles V.

The tower collapsed during the 1693 Sicily earthquake. It was rebuilt, although some modifications were made to its original design.

The village of Pozzallo first began to develop around the tower during the 18th century. It was initially a community of a few hundred people, including soldiers and fishermen, but it eventually grew to a town.

Today, the tower is in good condition, and it is now open to the public as the Museo della torre Cabrera. The building is a national monument, and it is depicted on the coat of arms of Pozzallo. Some of its windows have been rebuilt in their original style.

References

Cabrera
Buildings and structures in the Province of Ragusa
Museums in Sicily
Cabrera